Duncan MacGregor (born 25 March 1952) is a former  Australian rules footballer who played with South Melbourne in the Victorian Football League (VFL).

Notes

External links 

Living people
1952 births
Australian rules footballers from Victoria (Australia)
Sydney Swans players